Francis Pym Harding  (23 September 1821 – 25 February 1875) was an English general in the British Army and the second Lieutenant Governor of New Brunswick from 1867 to 1868.

Born in The Grove, Lymington, Hampshire, England, Harding was an officer in the 22nd Foot (Cheshire Regiment) and was promoted to colonel in 1858. He was transferred from Malta to New Brunswick in 1866 and was appointed commanding officer. As the senior military officer, he was recommended by Charles Hastings Doyle for the position of Lieutenant Governor of New Brunswick and was appointed in 1867. In 1868, he was promoted to the rank of major general and returned to England in 1869.

He died in Grove, Lymington, Hampshire, England in 1875.

References
 Biography at the Dictionary of Canadian Biography Online

1821 births
1875 deaths
British Army major generals
Companions of the Order of the Bath
Lieutenant Governors of New Brunswick
Cheshire Regiment officers
People from Lymington
British Army personnel of the Crimean War